Thomas Malcolm Tejan-Sie (born 23 November 1988) is an English footballer who plays as a midfielder for Wingate & Finchley.

Career 
Born in Camden, London, Tejan-Sie made his debut for Dagenham & Redbridge in the Football League Trophy, in the 1–0 away win against Peterborough United on 7 October 2008, coming on as a substitute in the 86th minute for Mark Nwokeji. He made his Football League debut against Exeter City in the 2–1 home defeat, on 20 January 2009, coming on as a substitute for Solomon Taiwo in the 79th minute.

At the start of the 2009–10 season, Tejan-Sie was loaned out for a month to Conference South club Braintree Town.

In January 2011, Tejan-Sie went on a month loan to Conference South club Thurrock. The deal later was extendend by two further months.
In May 2011 Dagenham announced the release of Tejan-Sie at the end of his contract.

He joined Wingate & Finchley in August 2013, making his debut on the opening day of the season in a 4–0 victory over Carshalton Athletic. Tejan-Sie scored his first goal for Wingate & Finchley against Corinthian-Casuals in the London Senior Cup Second Round on 3 December 2013, and scored his first league goal in a 3–1 home victory against Thamesmead Town on 25 January 2014

References

External links 

Aylesbury United

1988 births
Living people
Footballers from the London Borough of Camden
English footballers
Dagenham & Redbridge F.C. players
Billericay Town F.C. players
Braintree Town F.C. players
Thurrock F.C. players
Wingate & Finchley F.C. players
English Football League players
National League (English football) players
Isthmian League players
Black British sportspeople
Association football midfielders